The Hannan Medal in the Mathematical Sciences is awarded every two years by the Australian Academy of Science to recognize achievements by Australians in the fields of pure mathematics, applied and computational mathematics, and statistical science.

This medal commemorates the work of the late Edward J. Hannan, FAA, for his achievements in time series analysis.

Winners
Source:

See also

 List of mathematics awards

Notes

External links
 Hannan Medal site of the Australian Academy of Science

Mathematics awards
Australian science and technology awards
Awards established in 1994
Australian Academy of Science Awards
1994 establishments in Australia